Manuel D'Souza (5 December 1989 in Mumbai, Maharashtra) is an Indian footballer who plays as a forward for Mumbai F.C. in the I-League.

Career

Mumbai
D'Souza started his footballing career with Mumbai F.C. of the I-League. He started making a name for himself with the under-19 side in the Mumbai Elite Division in 2010. D'Souza made his first-team debut for the club on 6 May 2012 in Mumbai's last I-League match of the 2011-12 season and scored within 8 minutes to give Mumbai the early lead but that was not enough as Mumbai lost the match 5-2 in the end.

Career statistics

Club

References

Indian footballers
1989 births
Living people
I-League players
Mumbai FC players
Footballers from Mumbai
Association football forwards